Aluminium dihydrogenphosphate describes inorganic compounds with the formula Al(H2PO4)3.xH2O where x = 0 or 3.  They are white solids.  Upon heating these materials convert sequentially to a family of related polyphosphate salts including aluminum triphosphate (AlH2P3O10.2H2O), aluminium hexametaphosphate (Al2P6O18), and aluminium tetrametaphosphate (Al4(P4O12)3).  Some of these materials are used for fireproofing and as ingredients in specialized glasses.

According to analysis by X-ray crystallography, the structure consists of a coordination polymer featuring octahedral Al3+ centers bridged by tetrahedral dihydrogen phosphate ligands. The dihydrogen phosphate ligands are bound to Al3+ as monodentate ligands.

References

Phosphates
Aluminium compounds